Meal preparation, sometimes called meal prep, is the process of planning and preparing meals.

Advance preparation

Meal preparation involves preparing meals ahead of time for a short or period of time. This practice may occur among people who desire to lose weight, gain muscle mass, or maintain a healthy lifestyle. Advance preparation can serve to standardize food portions. Meals preparation are fully cooked. Meals may be prepared in small containers such as Tupperware, and are sometimes labeled and dated to remain organized.

Benefits

Saving money 
By preparing meals in advance, there is a limited need for an individual to purchase food from restaurants or bars, which can have an average markup rate of around 300%. According to the 2020 Consumer Expenditures Report from the Bureau of Labor Statistics, there was a 32.6 percent decrease in spending of food away from home from 2019 to 2020 and, simultaneously, there was a 6.4 percent increase in spending in food at home (which is defined as food at grocery stores and other food stores where the final purchaser is the consumer.) These trends can be attributed to the rise of the COVID-19 during this period as consumers were more hesitant to eat out at this time. The rise in spending for food at home and decrease for food away from home means people were preparing more food at home. Which led to the average consumer saving approximately $1151 from eating out less from 2019 to 2020.

Healthy eating 
By using fresh, healthy ingredients as opposed to eating out or consuming a higher volume of processed foods, meal preparation provides numerous health benefits over eating outside of the home frequently. For example, multiple studies have shown that those who consume meals that were prepared at home more often had a significantly lower risk of acquiring type 2 diabetes mellitus.  On the contrary, those who meal prep less and eat out more and consume more processed foods have seen to have a significantly higher risk of getting conditions such as hypertension, dyslipidemia, or cancer.  Studies have also shown that individuals who eat more meals out, consume a significantly higher amount of sugar and fat and a significantly lower amount of important micronutrients such as iron, calcium and vitamin C.

See also
 List of cooking techniques
 Meal delivery service
 Microwave oven
 Multicooker
 Outline of food preparation
 Quarantine mealprep

References

Further reading

 Foods and Meal Preparation
 Kitchen Afloat
 Meal Preparation as a Family Therapy Intervention
 A Guide to Meal Management and Table Services' 2004 Ed.
 Planning Related to Meal Preparation
 Space Allowances for Meal Preparation and Service in the Southern Rural Home
 "A Value-Added Approach to Household Production: The Special Case of Meal Preparation". jstor.
 
 

Meals
Preparedness